Galina, Halyna, or Halina (from Greek γαλήνη "Serenity") is an East Slavic feminine given name, also popular in Bulgaria and Slovenia during the period of Soviet influence. Galina is the standard transliteration from Russian. It is generally transliterated as Halyna from Ukrainian and as Halina from Belarusian. The latter form is also frequently found in Poland.

Nicknames include Galya (or Halya), Galka (or Halka), Gala, Galochka, and Galechka.

In ancient Greek mythology, Galene was one of the Nereid mermaids, known as the goddess of calm seas. Two Christian female martyrs of this name are recognized by the Orthodox church: the first died in 252  (feast day March 10), the other one, the more famous Galene of Corinth, in 290 (feast day April 16).

Given name 

Notable bearers of this name include:

 Galina Antyufeyeva, Transnistrian politician and the wife of Vladimir Antyufeyev.
 Alina Astafei known before 1995 as Galina Astafei
 Galina Beloglazova, Russian rhythmic gymnast
 Galina Borzenkova, Russian handball player
 Galina Brezhneva, daughter of the Soviet leader Leonid Brezhnev
 Galina Bogomolova, Russian long-distance runner
 Galina Bukharina, Soviet athlete
 Galina Burdina, Soviet fighter pilot
 Galina Bystrova, Soviet athlete
 Galina Chistyakova, Soviet long jumper
 Galina Danilchenko (born 1964), Ukrainian accountant and politician 
 Galina Dodon, Moldovan First Lady
 Galina Dyuragina, Russian author and child psychologist
 Galina Dzhugashvili, Russian translator of French
 Galina Efremenko, Ukrainian figure skater
 Galina Eguiazarova, Russian pianist
 Galina Gorokhova, Soviet and Russian fencer
 Galina Grzhibovskaya, Soviet figure skater
 Galina Kakovkina, Russian artist
 Galina Kreft, Soviet sprint canoer
 Galina Korchuganova, Soviet/Russian test pilot and aerobatics champion
 Galina Kulakova, Soviet cross country skier
 Galina Kofman, Russian-born, American computer scientist
 Galina Kopernak, Russian theater actress
 Galina Koukleva, Russian biathlete
 Halyna Kuzmenko, Ukrainian teacher and anarchist revolutionary
 Galina Likhachova, Russian speed skater
 Galina Lukashenko, First Lady of Belarus
 Galina Malchugina, Russian sprinter
 Galina Mezentseva, Russian ballerina
 Galina Miklínová, Czech illustrator and director
 Galina Mishenina, Russian rower
Galina Mitrokhina (rowing) (born 1940), Russian rower
Galina Mitrokhina (athletics) (born 1944), Russian track and field athlete
 Galina Murašova, Lithuanian discus thrower
 Galina Onopriyenko, Russian handball player
 Galina Pedan, Kyrgyzstani athlete
 Galina Penkova, Bulgarian sprinter
 Galina Pilyushenko, Soviet cross country skier
 Galina Polskikh, Soviet film actress
 Galina Poryvayeva, Russian sprint canoeist
 Galina Prozumenshchikova, Soviet swimmer
 Galina Rytova, Russian-Kazakhstani water polo player
 Galina Samsova, Russian ballerina
 Galina Savenko, Soviet sprint canoeist
 Galina Savinkova, track and field athlete
 Galina Sergeyeva, (1914–2000) Russian actress
 Galina Shamrai, Soviet gymnast
 Galina Shubina, Russian poster and graphics artist
 Galina Stancheva, Bulgarian volleyball player
 Galina Starovoytova, Russian politician and ethnographer
 Galina Stepanskaya, speed skater
 Galina Timchenko (born 1962), Russian journalist
 Galina Tyurina (1938–1970), Soviet mathematician
 Galina Ulanova, Russian ballerina
 Galina Varlamova, Evenk writer
 Galina Vishnevskaya, Russian opera singer
 Galina Vecherkovskaya (born 1926), Russian rower
 Galina Vinogradova, Russian orienteering competitor
 Galina Vishnevskaya, Russian opera singer
 Galina Voskoboeva, Russian-Kazakhstani tennis player
 Galina Yermolayeva (rower), Russian rower
 Galina Yershova, Russian academic historian
 Galina Zmievskaya, Ukrainian figure skating coach
 Galina Zhikareva, Soviet sprint canoeist
 Galina Zybina, Russian shot-putter and javelin thrower

References

See also
 Galenka
 
 
 

Bulgarian feminine given names
Russian feminine given names
Ukrainian feminine given names
Serbian feminine given names
Slovene feminine given names
Croatian feminine given names